Glückstadt (also Gelukstadt) is a village some 32 km south-east of Vryheid. Formed in 1906 as the centre for farming families. The name is German and means 'city of happiness'. This village was probably named after Glückstadt, a city on the Elbe River in Germany.

References

Populated places in the Abaqulusi Local Municipality
Populated places established in 1906
German settlements in South Africa
1906 establishments in the Colony of Natal